Tempuling Airport is a domestic airport located at Tembilahan, the capital of Indragiri Hilir Regency, Riau province, Indonesia. It serves Tembilahan and surrounding areas. Currently, this airport only serves flights to and from Pekanbaru. This airport is able to serve aircraft equivalent to BAe 146 and ATR 72.

History
The airport was built since 2006 and finished in 2008. This airport is actually located in Sungai Salak Village, Tempuling District, 24 km from Tembilahan. The runway has been extended from 1,350 metres to 1,800 metres to accommodate larger aircraft than previous, and the airport now is able to accommodate aircraft equivalent to BAe 146 and ATR 72.

A new airport terminal is under construction and was expected to be finished in 2019.

Airlines and destinations

Statistics

References

Airports in Riau